Kachama-Ganjule is an Afroasiatic language spoken in Ethiopia on islands in Lake Chamo and Lake Abaya. Kachama is spoken on Gidicho island in Lake Abaya, whereas Ganjule was originally spoken on a small island in Lake Chamo. Now the Ganjule speakers have relocated to the west shore of the Lake. There still are about 1,000 monolinguals in this language.

Blench (2006) lists Gidicho, Kachama, and Ganjule as separate languages. Ethnologue gives Gatame/Get'eme/Gats'ame as a synonym; however, Blench treats that as a separate language as well, a synonym with Haruro/Harro. While he moves the others to the northern branch of the Ometo languages, he leaves Gatame/Haruro in the eastern branch.  No evidence is presented for treating these as separate languages.

Notes

North Omotic languages
Languages of Ethiopia